John Tyson (born September 5, 1953) is an American billionaire heir and businessman. He was chief executive officer (CEO) of the family business, Tyson Foods, from 2000 to 2006, and has been chairman since 1998.

Biography

Early life
Tyson was born on September 5, 1953, in Springdale, Arkansas. His grandfather was John W. Tyson, the founder of Tyson Foods. His father, Don Tyson, was CEO of the family business. His mother was Jean Tyson. He graduated from Springdale High School in 1971. He attended the University of Arkansas in Fayetteville, where he was initiated into the Phi Delta Theta fraternity in 1972. He then transferred to the University of Southern California in Los Angeles. Finally, he transferred to Southern Methodist University in Dallas, Texas, where he received a bachelor of business administration  degree. He attended the University of Arkansas School of Law for a year, but dropped out, deciding that becoming a lawyer was not for him.

Career
He worked at the family business, Tyson Foods, since his teenage years. In 1984, he joined the board of directors. In 1990, he served as vice chairman and in 1993, as president of the beef and pork division. He was CEO from 1999 to 2006. Since 1998, he has been chairman. Under his leadership as chairman and CEO, Tyson Foods acquired IBP, Inc., becoming the world's largest protein-processing company. Under his leadership as Chairman, Tyson acquired Hillshire Brands for $63 per share, making the merger the largest deal within the meat industry.

He is a member of the board of directors of Crystal Bridges Museum of American Art. He has served on the boards of the Walden Woods Project, which seeks to maintain the land, literature and legacy of Henry David Thoreau. He has also served on the advisory board for the Yale Center for Faith and Culture at Yale University, the board of trustees of the University of Arkansas, and as committee chairman of the University of Arkansas Capital Campaign for the 21st Century. He has also served on the Boards of the American Meat Institute, the National Chicken Council, the National Council on Alcoholism and Drug Dependence, and the Searchlight Leadership Fund. The Tyson Center for Faith and Spirituality in the Workplace at the Sam M. Walton College of Business at the University of Arkansas is named in his honor. He is a recipient of the Woodrow Wilson Award for Corporate Citizenship from the Woodrow Wilson International Center for Scholars. He has received the International Faith and Spirit at Work award.

He is the founder of the Blessings Golf Club in Fayetteville, Arkansas.

Personal life
He is an Episcopalian. He collects art, and owns paintings by Willem de Kooning, Roy Lichtenstein and Andy Warhol. He married in 1987 and divorced in 1998.  He lives in Johnson, Arkansas. He fathered two children John Randal and Olivia Laine. John Randal is the current CFO for Tyson Foods. His son John Randal had been arrested for allegedly drunkenly falling asleep in a stranger's home

References

1953 births
Living people
People from Springdale, Arkansas
Springdale High School alumni
Southern Methodist University alumni
Businesspeople from Arkansas
American chief executives of food industry companies
University of Arkansas people
Tyson Foods people
American billionaires